"Zise Ti Zoi" is a single by popular Greek singer Sakis Rouvas from the Alter Ego original soundtrack, released on 28 May 2007 in Greece and Cyprus by Minos EMI.

Background

Production history
The song "Zise Ti Zoi" was composed as the theme to the Greek film Alter Ego that was released on 10 May 2007 and starred Sakis Rouvas. The song was composed by Antonis Vardis, while the lyrics were written by Vasilis Giannopoulos. The CD single included four of the radio singles from the Alter Ego soundtrack, all of which were performed by Rouvas. Two of the songs are duets with Doretta Papadimitriou who played Nefeli in the film, opposite Rouvas.

Track listing
CD single

iTunes release

Music video

The music video was directed by production company White Room. It features many scenes from the film Alter Ego as well as newly filmed material.

Release history

External links
  Official site

2007 singles
Film music
Greek-language songs
Sakis Rouvas songs
2007 songs
Minos EMI singles